Richard Setter alias Milers (before 1390 – 1422) was an English politician.

Family
In 1410, he married Christine Plomer, the widow of another Wells MP, John Blithe.

Career
He was a Member (MP) of the Parliament of England for Wells in 1417, 1420 and 1422.

References

15th-century deaths
English MPs 1420
Year of birth unknown
Place of birth unknown
Date of death unknown
English MPs 1417
English MPs 1422